100% (trans. Εκατό Τοις Εκατό; One Hundred Percent) is the twenty second studio album by Greek singer Angela Dimitriou.

It was released on 25 May 1998 by Minos EMI and was reached platinum status in Greece, selling 60,000 units, and this is the third collaboration of Angela with Phoebus who composed all the tracks. It was released also in Turkey and certified quadruple-platinum, selling 200,000 units. The album was containing many of her most successful songs, including "100%", "Den Eisai Tipota" and "Akatoikites Oi Nihtes".

Track listing

Singles and music videos
The following singles were officially released to radio stations and the songs "100%", "Den Eisai Tipota" and "Akatoikites Oi Nihtes" was released with music videos. The songs "Tha S' Oneirefto", "Terma", "Mi Me Rotas", "Emena Kai Ta Matia Sou" and "Skoni", despite not having been released as singles, managed to gain radio airplay.

 100%
 Den Eisai Tipota (You're Nothing)
 Akatoikites Oi Nihtes (Uninhabited Nights)
 Adianoito (Unthinkable)
 T' Anapospasto Kommati (The Insperable Part)
 Tha Sou Leipo (You'll Miss Me)

Credits and personnel

Personnel 
Takis Anagnostou: backing vocals (tracks: 1, 3, 4, 5, 6, 7, 8, 10, 11, 12, 14)

Hakan Bingolou: cümbüş (tracks: 7, 8, 10) || säzi (tracks: 1, 3, 5, 10, 12, 14) || tzoura (tracks: 1, 14)

Giannis Mpithikotsis: baglama (tracks: 2, 6, 9, 11, 12, 13) || bouzouki (tracks: 2, 6, 9, 11, 13) || tzoura (tracks: 6, 12, 13)

Achilleas Dantilis: keyboards (tracks: 4)

Pavlos Diamantopoulos: bass (tracks: 1, 2, 4, 5, 6, 8, 9, 10, 11, 12, 13)

Vaggelis Giannopoulos: additional backing vocals (tracks: 4, 5, 6, 8, 12, 14)

Antonis Gounaris: guitars (tracks: 1, 2, 3, 4, 5, 6, 7, 8, 9, 10, 11, 12, 13)

Anna Ioannidou: backing vocals (tracks: 1, 3, 4, 5, 6, 7, 8, 10, 11, 12, 13, 14) || second vocal (tracks: 2)

Telis Ketselidis: keyboards, orchestration, programming (tracks: 2, 9 ,13)

Katerina Kiriakou: backing vocals (tracks: 1, 3, 4, 5, 6, 7, 8, 10, 11, 12, 13, 14)

Giorgos Lebesis: backing vocals (tracks: 1, 3, 4, 5, 6, 7, 8, 10, 11, 12, 14)

Fedon Lionoudakis: accordion (tracks: 6, 11, 13)

Takis Livanos: second vocal (tracks: 5, 9, 13)

Andreas Mouzakis: break drums (tracks: 14) || drums (tracks: 1, 2, 4, 5, 6, 8, 9, 10, 11, 12, 13)

Alex Panagis: backing vocals (tracks: 1, 3, 4, 5, 6, 7, 8, 10, 11, 12, 14)

Chrisoula Papazeti: backing vocals (tracks: 1, 3, 4, 5, 6, 7, 8, 10, 11, 12, 13, 14)

Phoebus: additional backing vocals (tracks: 4, 5, 6, 8, 12, 14) || keyboards, orchestration, programming (tracks: 1, 3, 4, 5, 6, 7, 8, 10, 11, 12, 14)

Giorgos Roilos: percussion (tracks: 1, 2, 3, 4, 5, 6, 8, 10, 11, 12, 14)

Thanasis Vasilopoulos: clarinet (tracks: 3, 5, 8) || ney (tracks: 5, 7)

Nikos Zervas: keyboards (tracks: 5, 8)

Production 
Thodoris Chrisanthopoulos (Fabelsound): mastering

Ntinos Diamantopoulos: photographer

Vaggelis Giannopoulos: executive producer

Tolis Ketselidis (Libra studio): sound engineer (tracks: 2, 9, 13)

Giorgos Stabolis (Phase One studio): editing (all tracks) || sound engineer (tracks: 1, 3, 4, 5, 6, 7, 8, 10, 11, 12, 14)

Manolis Vlachos (Phase One studio): mix engineer (all tracks) || sound engineer (tracks: 1, 3, 4, 5, 6, 7, 8, 10, 11, 12, 14)

Krina Vronti: art direction

Credits adapted from the album's liner notes.

Charts

References

1998 albums
Minos EMI albums
Greek-language albums
Albums produced by Phoebus (songwriter)
Angela Dimitriou albums